Dino Lamb (born 18 April 1998) is an English rugby union player who plays for Harlequins in the Premiership Rugby.

He was a replacement in the Premiership final against Exeter on 26 June 2021 as Harlequins won the game 40-38 in the highest scoring Premiership final ever.

References

External links
Harlequins Profile
ESPN Profile
Ultimate Rugby Profile

1998 births
Living people
English rugby union players
Rugby union players from Warwickshire
Rugby union locks